Drawsko  is a village in Czarnków-Trzcianka County, Greater Poland Voivodeship, in west-central Poland. It is the seat of the gmina (administrative district) called Gmina Drawsko.

The village has a population of 1,640.

The remains of six skeletons, which were allegedly interred as vampires in the 17th and 18th century, were found in archaeologic excavations of the local cemetery. However the theory about "vampire burials" there has been contested later.

References

Drawsko